Sataria is a genus of harvestmen in the family Sclerosomatidae from India.

Species
 Sataria coronata Roewer, 1929
 Sataria maculata Roewer, 1915
 Sataria unicolor Roewer, 1915

References

Harvestmen
Harvestman genera